Stenamma expolitum is a species of ant native to the wet forests of Costa Rica at elevations of .

Description
The species have black legs and a dorsal face which have a transverse rugae. It propodeum is identical in brightness to promesonotum.

Habitat
The species is found on clay banks, along the streams, and on hillsides.

References

External links

Myrmicinae
Insects described in 1962
Hymenoptera of North America